Anthony J. Diekema (born 1933) was the President of Calvin College from 1976 to 1995.

Diekema graduated from Calvin College in 1956, where he played on the men's basketball team, and went on to receive a master's degree and a doctorate in sociology from Michigan State University. When Diekema came to Calvin College in 1976, he completed the development of the campus master plan and began construction projects to meet growing needs. He also purchased more land for the college to expand further and oversaw the expansion of the curriculum. During his tenure, enrollments rose above 4,000 for the first time. He is married to Doris Jeane Waanders and they have seven children.

References

1933 births
American people of Dutch descent
Calvin University alumni
Living people
Michigan State University alumni
Presidents of Calvin University
People from Grand Rapids, Michigan
People from Zeeland, Michigan